Mimagoniatites is a genus of ammonoid cephalopod which lived during the early Devonian, regarded as belonging to the Agoniatitdae as a member of the subfamily Mimagoniatitinae.

The shell is discoidal, primarily evolute, becoming mildly involute in later growth stage, moderately to rapidly expanding.  Whorl section of first two whorls approximately circular, subtrapezoidal in later whorls. Umbilicas perforated, protoconch swollen, not in contact with first whorl. Growth lines biconvex with prominent ventrolateral projections and a deep ventral sinus.

References

Mimagoniatites in GONIAT online
Mimagoniatites, Paleobio db. 
Miller, Furnish, and Schindewolf, 1957. Paleozoic Ammonoidea; Treatise on Invertebrate Paleontology, Part L.

Agoniatitida
Devonian animals of Europe
Fossils of the Czech Republic
Devonian ammonites
Paleozoic life of Nunavut